129P/Shoemaker–Levy, also known as Shoemaker–Levy 3, is a periodic comet in the Solar System. It fits the definition of an Encke-type comet with (TJupiter > 3; a < aJupiter), and is a quasi-Hilda comet.

This comet should not be confused with Comet Shoemaker–Levy 9 (D/1993 F2), which spectacularly crashed into Jupiter in 1994.

References

External links 
 Orbital simulation from JPL (Java) / Horizons Ephemeris
 129P/Shoemaker-Levy 3 – Seiichi Yoshida @ aerith.net
 Elements and Ephemeris for 129P/Shoemaker-Levy – Minor Planet Center
 129P at Kronk's Cometography

Periodic comets
Encke-type comets
0129
Discoveries by Carolyn S. Shoemaker
Discoveries by Eugene Merle Shoemaker
Discoveries by David H. Levy
Comets in 2014
19910207